The 1939 Prince Edward Island general election was held in the Canadian province of Prince Edward Island on May 18, 1939.

The governing Liberals of Premier Thane Campbell were able to retain a strong majority in the Legislature, though not as impressive as their total sweep of all 30 seats in the previous election. Campbell became Premier in 1936 following the death of his predecessor Walter Lea. This election was the first to see a government re-elected to a second term since the 1915 election.

The Conservatives, led by former Premier William J.P. MacMillan were able to win back three districts and return an Official Opposition to Legislature. Following the lead of the federal Conservatives in 1942, the party changed its name to the "Progressive Conservatives" (or PCs), which remains the party's name today.

Party standings

Members elected

The Legislature of Prince Edward Island had two levels of membership from 1893 to 1996 - Assemblymen and Councillors. This was a holdover from when the Island had a bicameral legislature, the General Assembly and the Legislative Council.

In 1893, the Legislative Council was abolished and had its membership merged with the Assembly, though the two titles remained separate and were elected by different electoral franchises. Assembleymen were elected by all eligible voters of within a district, while Councillors were only elected by landowners within a district.

Kings

Queens

Prince

Sources

1939 elections in Canada
Elections in Prince Edward Island
1939 in Prince Edward Island
May 1939 events